Tiaa (15th century BC) was an Ancient Egyptian queen of the 18th dynasty, the wife of Amenhotep II and mother of Thutmose IV.

Tiaa or TIAA may refer to:

 Tiaa (princess) (15th century BC), Egyptian princess of the 18th dynasty, daughter of Thutmose IV
 Tia (princess) (13th century BC), or Tiaa, Egyptian princess of the 19th dynasty, daughter of Seti I
 Tiaa (wife of Seti II) (12th century BC), Egyptian noblewoman and wife of Seti II
 TIAA, an American financial services company
 Texas Intercollegiate Athletic Association (TIAA), American college sports conference that operated from 1909 to 1932
 Texas Intercollegiate Athletic Association (1976–1997) (TIAA), American college sports conference that operated from 1976 to 1999